Under Southern Skies is a lost 1915 American silent film drama directed by Lucius Henderson and starring Mary Fuller. It was produced and released by the Universal Film Manufacturing Company.

Cast
Mary Fuller - Lelia Crofton
Charles Stanton Ogle - Major Crofton
Clara Beyers - Stella Crofton (*as Clara Byers)
A. H. Busby - Colonel Mavor (*as Bert Bushy)
Milton Sills - Burleigh Mavor
William Heidloff - Ambrose Mavor
Jack Ridgeway - Colonel Daubeney (*as John Ridgway)
Paul Panzer - Steve Daubeney
Marie Shotwell - Mrs. Hampton
Mary Moore - Fifi Hampton
Harry Blakemore - Uncle Joshuaway
Nellie Slattery - Aunt Doshey
Margaret Wall - Anner Lizer
Marie Weirman - Phinney

References

External links
Under Southern Skies at IMDb.com

miniature styled poster(Wayback Machine)

1915 films
American silent feature films
Lost American films
American films based on plays
Films directed by Lucius J. Henderson
Universal Pictures films
American black-and-white films
Silent American drama films
1915 drama films
1915 lost films
Lost drama films
1910s American films
1910s English-language films